Cineraria is a genus of flowering plants in the sunflower family, native primarily to southern Africa with a few species farther north. The genus includes herbaceous plants and small subshrubs.

In the past, the genus was commonly viewed in a broader sense including a number of species from the Canary Islands and Madeira which are now transferred to the genus Pericallis, including the florist's cineraria (Pericallis × hybrida).

Species
, Plants of the World Online accepts the following species:

Cineraria abyssinica Sch.Bip. ex A.Rich.
Cineraria albicans N.E.Br.
Cineraria albomontana Hilliard
Cineraria alchemilloides DC.
Cineraria anampoza (Baker) Baker
Cineraria arctotidea DC.
Cineraria aspera Thunb.
Cineraria atriplicifolia DC.
Cineraria austrotransvaalensis Cron
Cineraria britteniae Hutch. & R.A.Dyer
Cineraria burkei Burtt Davy
Cineraria canescens Wendl.Obs. ex Link
Cineraria cyanomontana Cron
Cineraria decipiens Harv.
Cineraria deltoidea Sond.
Cineraria densiflora R.E.Fr.
Cineraria dieterlenii E.Phillips
Cineraria dryogeton Cron
Cineraria erodioides DC.
Cineraria erosa Harv.
Cineraria exilis DC.
Cineraria geifolia (L.) L.
Cineraria geraniifolia DC.
Cineraria glandulosa Cron
Cineraria grandibracteata Hilliard
Cineraria huilensis Cron
Cineraria humifusa L'Hér.
Cineraria laxiflora R.E.Fr.
Cineraria lobata L'Hér.
Cineraria longipes S.Moore
Cineraria lyratiformis Cron
Cineraria magnicephala Cron
Cineraria mazoensis S.Moore
Cineraria microglossa DC.
Cineraria mitellifolia L'Hér.
Cineraria mollis E.Mey. ex DC.
Cineraria ngwenyensis Cron
Cineraria parvifolia Burtt Davy
Cineraria pinnata O.Hoffm. ex Schinz
Cineraria platycarpa DC.
Cineraria polycephala DC.
Cineraria pulchra Cron
Cineraria saxifraga DC.
Cineraria sebaldii Cufod.
Cineraria tomentolanata Govaerts
Cineraria vagans Hilliard
Cineraria vallis-pacis Dinter ex Merxm.

References

 
Asteraceae genera
Flora of Africa